Christopher Feldborg Nielsen (born 15 September 1992) is a Swedish professional golfer. He has five wins on the Nordic Golf League (NGL) and won the 2021 NGL Order of Merit to earn promotion to the Challenge Tour after he shot an albatross on the final hole of the Road to Europe Tour Final.

Professional career
Feldborg Nielsen was born in Ystad, Sweden. He turned professional in 2012 and started playing on the Swedish Golf Tour. In 2013, he joined the Nordic Golf League, where his best finish was a T4 in the Danish PGA Championship.

In 2014, he won his first title, the Bravo Tours Open in Denmark, and he was runner-up in the Danish PGA Championship. He lost the final of the 2014 Swedish Matchplay Championship to Patrick O'Neill of Denmark, but walked away with the National Matchplay Champion title for which other nationals are ineligible.

In 2015, he enjoyed 6 top-5 finishes on the NGL, and in 2016 he made seven starts on the Challenge Tour, with a best finish of T20 in the Vierumäki Finnish Challenge. In 2017, he was runner-up at the Swedish PGA Championship and won the Tinderbox Charity Challenge in Denmark. He finished second on the NGL Order of Merit and was promoted to the 2018 Challenge Tour, where he made 7 cuts in 19 starts, with a best finish of T14 in the Made in Denmark Challenge.

Back on the 2019 NGL, he was runner-up at the Swedish Matchplay Championship and the Willis Towers Watson Masters in Denmark. His best finish in 2020 was a T3 at Visby Open. In 2021, he won three titles, the PGA Championship Landeryd Masters, the Timberwise Finnish Open and the Road to Europe Tour Final, to top the NGL Order of Merit and earn another promotion to the Challenge Tour.

His win at the Road to Europe Tour Final was so dramatic, it was reported on by Golf Digest, which called it "the most ludicrous finish to a golf tournament you'll ever hear". Feldborg Nielsen was two strokes off the lead as he stood on the par-5 18th tee. He hit his tee shot into the rough. He then amazingly holed his second shot from this disadvantageous lie for an albatross 2, forcing the tournament into a playoff where he triumphed.

Professional wins (7)

Nordic Golf League wins (5)

Other wins (2)
2015 Sjöbo Open
2019 Sjöbo Open

Source:

References

External links

Swedish male golfers
People from Ystad
1992 births
Living people